A mission control center (MCC, sometimes called a flight control center or operations center) is a facility that manages space flights, usually from the point of launch until landing or the end of the mission. It is part of the ground segment of spacecraft operations. A staff of flight controllers and other support personnel monitor all aspects of the mission using telemetry, and send commands to the vehicle using ground stations. Personnel supporting the mission from an MCC can include representatives of the attitude control system, power, propulsion, thermal, attitude dynamics, orbital operations and other subsystem disciplines. The training for these missions usually falls under the responsibility of the flight controllers, typically including extensive rehearsals in the MCC.

NASA's Mission Control Center

United States missions are, prior to liftoff, controlled from the Launch Control Center (LCC) located at NASA's Kennedy Space Center on Merritt Island, Florida. Responsibility for the booster and spacecraft remains with the Launch Control Center until the booster has cleared the launch tower.

After liftoff, responsibility is handed over to NASA's Mission Control Center in Houston, Texas (abbreviated MCC-H, full name Christopher C. Kraft Jr. Mission Control Center), at the Lyndon B. Johnson Space Center. 

NASA's Mission Control Center in Houston also manages the U.S. portions of the International Space Station (ISS).

RKA Mission Control Center

The Mission Control Center of the Russian Federal Space Agency, also known by its acronym ЦУП ("TsUP") is located in Korolyov, near the RKK Energia plant. It contains an active control room for the ISS. It also houses a memorial control room for the Mir where the last few orbits of Mir before it burned up in the atmosphere are shown on the display screens.

ISRO Mission Control Centre

The Mission Control Center of the Indian Space Research Organisation  is located at Satish Dhawan Space Centre, Sriharikota, India.

European Space Operations Centre

 European Space Operations Centre (ESOC) is responsible for ESA's satellites and space probes. It is located in Darmstadt, Germany.

German Space Operations Center
 German Space Operations Center (GSOC) is responsible for DLR's satellites and other customer's missions. It is located in Oberpfaffenhofen near Munich, Germany.
 The Columbus Control Centre (Col-CC) at the German Aerospace Center (DLR) in Oberpfaffenhofen, Germany. It is the mission control center for the European Columbus research laboratory at the International Space Station.
 The Galileo Control Center (GCC) at the German Aerospace Center (DLR) in Oberpfaffenhofen, Germany. It is one of the mission control centers for the European Galileo Navigation System.

French Space Operations Center 
 The French National Centre for Space Studies (CNES) ATV Control Centre (ATV-CC) is located at the Toulouse Space Centre (CST) in Toulouse, France. It is the mission control center for the European Automated Transfer Vehicles, that regularly resupply ISS.

Beijing Aerospace Command and Control Center

Beijing Aerospace Command and Control Center is a command center for the Chinese space program which includes the Shenzhou missions. The building is inside a complex nicknamed Aerospace City.  The city is located in a suburb northwest of Beijing.

Spaceflight Operations Facility
The Jet Propulsion Laboratory (JPL) in Pasadena, California manages all of NASA's uncrewed spacecraft outside Earth's orbit and several research probes within along with the Deep Space Network from the Space Flight Operations Facility.

Other significant centers
America
 Boeing Satellite Development Center (SDC) Mission Control Center in El Segundo, California, US. In charge of several military satellites.
 Goddard Space Flight Center in Greenbelt, Maryland provides mission control for the Hubble Space Telescope.
 Lockheed Martin A2100 Space Operations Center (ASOC) in Newtown, Pennsylvania, US. In charge of several military satellites.
 Mercury Control Center was located on the Cape Canaveral Air Force Station and was used during Project Mercury. One of its still standing buildings now serves as a makeshift bunker for the media if a rocket explodes near the ground.
 Mobile Servicing System Control and Training at Saint-Hubert, Quebec, Canada. Supports Canadarm2 and "dextre" robotics operations.
 Space Systems/Loral Mission Control Center in Palo Alto, California, US.
 The MESSENGER and New Horizons missions were controlled from the Applied Physics Laboratory near Baltimore, Maryland.
 SpaceX’s Mission Control Center (MCC-X) in Hawthorne, California
 Multi-Mission Operations Center at the Ames Research Center
 Payload Operations and Integration Center at the Marshall Spaceflight Center in Huntsville, Alabama where science activities aboard the International Space Station are monitored around the clock.
Asia
 JEM Control Center and the HTV Control Center at the Tsukuba Space Center (TKSC) in Tsukuba, Japan manages operations aboard JAXA's Kibo ISS research laboratory and the resupply flights of the H-II Transfer Vehicle. JAXAs satellite operations are also based here.

Europe
 The ATV Control Centre (ATV-CC) is located at the Toulouse Space Centre (CST) in Toulouse, France. It is the mission control center for the European Automated Transfer Vehicles, that regularly resupply ISS.
 The Columbus Control Center (Col-CC) at the German Aerospace Center (DLR) in Oberpfaffenhofen, Germany. It is the mission control center for the European Columbus research laboratory at the International Space Station.
 The Rover Operations Control Centre (ROCC) is located in Turin, Italy. It will be the mission control center for the ExoMars rover Rosalind Franklin.
 Titov Main Test and Space Systems Control Centre, mission control center in Krasnoznamensk, Russia.

See also
 Control room
 Ground segment
 Launch status check

References

External links
 Mission Control Centre for the Russian Federal Space Agency 
 Space flight - Mission Control Center (English) 
 Goddard Space Flight Center
 Jet Propulsion Laboratory
 Columbus Control Centre
 Automated Transfer Vehicle Control Centre
 European Space Operations Center

Control center
Rooms
Spaceflight technology
Command and control